Eva Puig (1894–1968) was a Mexican film actress.

Partial filmography

 The Crime of Dr. Forbes (1936) - Mrs. Luigi (uncredited)
 Rancho Grande (1940) - Mama Fernandez (uncredited)
 Forty Little Mothers (1940) - Mama Lupini (uncredited)
 I Want a Divorce (1940) - Peppy's Mother (uncredited)
 North West Mounted Police (1940) - Ekawe
 The Texas Rangers Ride Again (1940) - Maria
 Romance of the Rio Grande (1940) - Marta
 Bowery Boy (1940) - Woman (uncredited)
 Ride on Vaquero (1941) - Maria (uncredited)
 Singapore Woman (1941) - Natasha
 Hold Back the Dawn (1941) - Lupita
 Mob Town (1941) - Mrs. Minch (uncredited)
 Below the Border (1942) - Aunt Maria
 Rio Rita (1942) - Marianna
 Vengeance of the West (1942) - Maria
 Undercover Man (1942) - Rosita Lopez
 The Lone Star Ranger (1942)
 Arabian Nights (1942) - Old Woman (uncredited)
 The Cisco Kid Returns (1945) - Señora
 A Medal for Benny (1945) - Mrs. Catalina (uncredited)
 A Bell for Adano (1945) - Woman (uncredited)
 Navajo Kid (1945) - 2nd Navajo Woman (uncredited)
 Snafu (1945) - Josephina
 Masquerade in Mexico (1945) - Bullfight Spectator (uncredited)
 San Antonio (1945) - Old Mexican Woman (uncredited)
 Two Sisters from Boston (1946) - Maria - Hairdresser (uncredited)
 Wild Beauty (1946) - Winnie (uncredited)
 Plainsman and the Lady (1946) - Anita Lopez (final film role)

References

Bibliography
 Robert McLaughlin. We'll Always Have the Movies: American Cinema during World War II. University Press of Kentucky, 2006.

External links

1894 births
1968 deaths
20th-century Mexican actresses
Mexican film actresses
People from Coatzacoalcos
Actresses from Veracruz
Mexican emigrants to the United States